Samuil Yevgenyevich Feinberg (also Samuel; 26 May 1890,  Odessa – 22 October 1962, Moscow) was a Russian and Soviet composer and pianist.

Biography
Born in Odessa, Feinberg lived in Moscow from 1894 and studied with Alexander Goldenweiser at the Moscow Conservatory. He also studied composition privately under Nikolai Zhilyayev. He graduated from the Conservatory in 1911, after which he embarked upon a career as a solo pianist, while composing on the side. However, he was soon sent to fight in the First World War for Russia until he became ill and was discharged. In 1922, he joined the faculty at the Moscow Conservatory, relaunching his pianistic career. By 1930, due to the political repressions in Stalin's Russia, Feinberg's concert activities became limited. He made only two foreign trips in the 1930s: Vienna in 1936 and Brussels in 1938; hence he is generally not well known outside Russia. In 1946, he was awarded the Stalin Prize.

Feinberg was the first pianist to perform the complete The Well-Tempered Clavier by Bach in concert in the USSR. He is most remembered today for his complete recording of it, and many other works from the classical and romantic eras. He also composed three piano concertos, a dozen piano sonatas (private recordings exist of him playing his piano Sonatas 1, 2, 9 and 12), as well as fantasias and other works for the instrument. Pianist Tatiana Nikolayeva said that each of his sonatas was a "poem of life". Feinberg has been called "A musical heir to Scriabin", who heard the young pianist play his fourth sonata and praised it highly.

He was a life-long bachelor. He lived with his brother Leonid, who was a poet and painter. He died in 1962, aged 72.

Honours and awards
 Stalin Prize – 1946
 Order of Lenin
 Honoured Artist of the RSFSR (1937)

Works

Compositions for solo piano

 Op. 1: Piano Sonata No. 1 (1915)
 Op. 2: Piano Sonata No. 2 (1915)
 Op. 3: Piano Sonata No. 3 (1917)
 Op. 5: Fantasia No. 1 (1917)
 Op. 6: Piano Sonata No. 4 (1918)
 Op. 8: Four Preludes (1920)
 Allegretto
 Misterioso
 Tumoltuoso
 Con moto
 Op. 9: Fantasia No. 2 (1921)
 Op. 10: Piano Sonata No. 5 (1921)
 Op. 11: Suite No. 1 (1922)
 Op. 13: Piano Sonata No. 6 (1923)
 Op. 15: Three Preludes (1922)
 Allegro affanato e molto rubato
 Andante con tenerezza
 Presto
 Op. 17: Two Cadenzas to Beethoven's Piano Concerto No. 4 (1930-1935)
 Op. 19: Humoresque
 Op. 19a: Berceuse
 Op. 21: Piano Sonata No. 7 (1925)
 Op. 21a: Piano Sonata No. 8 (1928)
 Op. 24a: Two Chuvash Melodies
 Op. 25: Suite No. 2 (1936)
 Op. 27a: Three Melodies (1938)
 Georgian Song
 Tartar Song
 Armenian Song
 Op. 29: Piano Sonata No. 9 (1939)
 Op. 30: Piano Sonata No. 10 (1940–44)
 Op. 31: 3 Transcriptions of symphonies of Tchaikovsky (1942)
 'Andante marziale' from Symphony No. 2, Op. 17
 'Waltz' from Symphony No. 5, Op. 64
 'Allegro molto vivace' from Symphony No. 6, Op. 74
 Op. 33: Two Pieces (1947)
 Tale
 Procession
 Op. 35: Transcriptions of works of J.S. Bach (1925-1934)
 Op. 37: Transcription of Prelude and Fugue in E Minor, BWV 548 by J.S. Bach (1937-1948?)
 Op. 38: Transcription of Largo from Organ Sonata No.5 in C Major, BWV 529 by J.S. Bach (1935-1938?)
 Op. 40: Piano Sonata No. 11 (1952)
 Op. 41: 4 Cadenzas to Mozart's Piano Concerto, K.467 (1952?)
 Op. 42: Transcription of Nocturne from String Quartet No.2, by A. Borodin (1942-1943?)
 Op. 43: 3 Transcriptions of Tchaikovsky's Songs, Op.54 (1942-1943?)
 Op. 45: Rhapsody on Kabardino-Balkarian Themes (1961)
 Op. 48: Piano Sonata No. 12 (1962)

Concertante
 Op. 20: Piano Concerto No. 1 in C major (1931)
 Op. 36: Piano Concerto No. 2 in D major (1944)
 Op. 44: Piano Concerto No. 3 in C minor (1947)

For piano and voice

 Op. 4: Two Romances after Alexander Pushkin and Mikhail Lermontov
 Заклинание (Incantation) 
 Из-под таинственной, холодной полумаски (Behind the Mysterious Cold Half-Mask)
 Op. 7: Three Romances after Alexander Blok
 Голоса (снежная ночь) – Voices (Snowy Night) 
 И я опять затих у ног (снежная ночь) – Once more I'm silent at your feet (Snowy Night) 
 В бездействии младом (стихи о прекрасной даме) – In Youthful indolence
 Op. 14: Four Romances after Valery Bryusov, Alexander Blok, and Andrei Bely (1917, unpublished)
 Op. 16: Three Romances after Alexander Pushkin (1923)
 Анчар – Anchar
 Друг мой милый – My Beloved
 Напрасно я бегу к Сионским высотам – In vain I hasten onto the heights of Sion
 Op. 18 – 5 National Songs (1932)
 Лох-Ломонд (Шотландская)
 Хоровод (Английская)
 Деревенская девушка (Английская)
 Похищение из Тюэри (Ирландская)
 Ночная песнь рыбаков (Валлийская)
 Op. 22: Two Songs after Aleksandr Zharov (1932)
 Op. 23: Three Songs (1938)
 Op. 23a: Song after Dmitry Dolgonemov (1934)
 Op. 24: 25 Chuvash Songs after Yuri Stremin (1935-1936)
 Op. 26: Eight Romances after Alexander Pushkin (1936)
 Не пой, красавица, при мне... – Do not sing, my beauty, to me
 Зимний вечер – Winter Evening
 Под небом голубым страны своей родной – Under the blue skies of her native land
 Туча – Cloud
 Три ключа – Three Springs
 Я помню чудное мгновенье – I Remember a Wonderful Moment
 Сожженное письмо – The Burned Letter
 Няне — Подруга дней моих суровых... – To Nanny – My friend through my travails, woes hardest..
 Op. 27: 12 Songs (1935-1937)
 Op. 28: Seven Romances after Mikhail Lermontov (1940)
 Дубовый листок – Oak Leaf
 Пленный рыцарь – The Imprisoned Knight
 Сон – The Dream
 Еврейская мелодия – Hebrew Melody
 Русалка – The River Sprite
 Нет, не тебя так пылко я люблю – No, it's not you I love so hotly
 Выхожу одни я но дорогу – Onto the Highway, on my own, I walk
 Op. 32: 3 Songs after Sergei Severtsev and Sergei Gorodetsky
 Op. 34: 6 Kabardian Songs (1941)
 Op. 39: 4 Songs after Yuri Stremin (1939)
 Op. 47: Maritsa, after Yugoslavian Folk Poetry (1958)
 Марица – Maritsa
 Первая любовь – The First Love
 Девушка и конь – The Horse and The Girl
 Разговор со смертью – Conversation with Death
 Македонская девушка – Macedonian Girl
 Уж как выпал снег... – Ah, How Fell The Snow
 Колыбельная – Lullaby
 Ожидание – Waiting

Violin sonatas
 Op. 12: Violin Sonata No. 1 (1912, incomplete)
 Op. 46: Violin Sonata No. 2 (1955–56)

References

External links
 Skalkottas Feinberg Society
 
 
 
'The Composer and The Performer' at Stanford School of Mathematics 

1890 births
1962 deaths
Musicians from Odesa
Russian classical pianists
Male classical pianists
Russian classical composers
Russian male classical composers
Soviet classical pianists
20th-century classical pianists
Soviet composers
Soviet male composers
Jewish classical composers
Moscow Conservatory alumni
Musicians from Moscow
Stalin Prize winners
Recipients of the Order of Lenin
Honored Artists of the RSFSR
20th-century classical composers
Jewish classical pianists
Ukrainian classical pianists
Jewish Ukrainian musicians
Odesa Jews
20th-century Russian male musicians